The 2019 Stockholm Open (also known as the Intrum Stockholm Open for sponsorship purposes) was a professional men's tennis tournament played on indoor hard courts. It was the 51st edition of the tournament, and part of the ATP Tour 250 series of the 2019 ATP Tour. It took place at the Kungliga tennishallen in Stockholm, Sweden from 14 to 20 October 2019. Fourth-seeded Denis Shapovalov won the singles title.

Singles main-draw entrants

Seeds

 1 Rankings are as of October 7, 2019

Other entrants
The following players received wildcards into the singles main draw:
  Grigor Dimitrov
  Elias Ymer
  Mikael Ymer

The following player received entry using a protected ranking into the singles main draw:
  Janko Tipsarević

The following players received entry from the qualifying draw:
  Dennis Novak
  Tommy Paul
  Alexei Popyrin
  Cedrik-Marcel Stebe

The following players received entry as lucky losers:
  Gianluca Mager
  Oscar Otte
  Yūichi Sugita

Withdrawals
Before the tournament
 Marco Cecchinato → replaced by  Stefano Travaglia
 Márton Fucsovics → replaced by  Oscar Otte
 Tommy Paul → replaced by  Gianluca Mager
 Juan Martín del Potro → replaced by  Janko Tipsarević
 Lucas Pouille → replaced by  Brayden Schnur
 Fernando Verdasco → replaced by  Yūichi Sugita

Doubles main-draw entrants

Seeds

 Rankings are as of October 7, 2019

Other entrants
The following pairs received wildcards into the doubles main draw:
  André Göransson /  Nathaniel Lammons
  Elias Ymer /  Mikael Ymer

Finals

Singles

  Denis Shapovalov defeated  Filip Krajinović, 6–4, 6–4

Doubles

  Henri Kontinen /  Édouard Roger-Vasselin defeated  Mate Pavić /  Bruno Soares, 6–4, 6–2

References

External links
 Official website 

 
Stockholm Open
Stockholm Open
2019 in Swedish tennis
Stockholm Open
2010s in Stockholm